Scary World is the second studio album by American electronic band Night Club. It was released on August 24, 2018 by Gato Blanco Records and produced by Mark Brooks under the moniker The 3 Kord Scissor King.  The LP debuted at #4 US, #8 UK and #11 Sweden on the iTunes electronic charts upon release. Electrozombies named "Scary World" #2 on their best albums of 2018. The song "Scary World" was included in The Electricity Club's 30 Songs of 2018.

Track listing

References

2018 albums
Night Club (band) albums